Meantime Brewing Company is a brewery based in Greenwich, London, England, and owned by Japan's Asahi Breweries .

The company was founded by Alastair Hook in 1999, and was purchased by SABMiller in May 2015. As part of the agreements made with regulators before Anheuser-Busch InBev was allowed to acquire SABMiller in 2016, Meantime was sold to Asahi Breweries of Japan in October 2016.

History
It was founded in 1999 by Alastair Hook, who trained at Heriot-Watt University and the brewing school of the Technical University of Munich of Weihenstephan. He started the brewery in a small lock-up on an industrial estate opposite Charlton Athletic’s ground, before moving to the Greenwich Brewery, 0° 2' 12" east of the Greenwich Meridian, and then to a site on nearby Blackwall Lane in 2010. The new brewery, including Rolec brewhouse, cost £7M; by 2013 they were producing 50,000 hectolitres but a growth rate of 60% per year meant that they expected to reach their capacity of 120,000 hectolitres by 2016.

In May 2015, it was announced that Meantime was being bought by SAB Miller, the world’s second-largest brewer, for an undisclosed amount.

In July 2015 Alastair Hook was named Brewer of the Year by the All-Party Parliamentary Beer Group at its annual awards dinner. In the same year The Beer Academy awarded Rod Jones, Meantime's beer sommelier and brewer, the Beer Sommelier of the Year title. This was also the year that production of Thomas Hardy's Ale began at Meantime.

In August 2015, Meantime stated that production of their London Lager had, on occasion, been outsourced to Grolsch (another SAB Miller brand) in the Netherlands to meet demand, but that the Dutch beer made up no more than 10% of any bottle. Meantime confirmed that the use of Dutch beer would no longer be necessary after additional investments at the brewery, with the aim of keeping production entirely in London.

Meantime was sold to Asahi Group Holdings of Japan in April 2016. The sale was completed on 13 October 2016. In January 2019 Asahi also bought the brewing division of Fuller's Brewery and its subsidiary Dark Star.  Meantime started production of Dark Star's portfolio of beers after Asahi closed the Sussex brewery in December 2022.

Beers

Meantime brews a range of twelve regularly available beers which focuses on traditional British and European styles such as Lager, Pale Ale, Porter and India Pale Ale. In addition, it also produces an annual range of limited edition seasonal ales, which vary each year.

Outlets
Meantime owns and operates the Greenwich Union public house on Royal Hill, Greenwich and, in 2010, opened the Old Brewery bar and restaurant with brewery in the original 1836 Brewhouse of the Old Royal Naval College, Greenwich, making it only the second brewery in the world to be located within a UNESCO World Heritage Site. After Asahi's purchase of Meantime these outlets were sold to Young's. The Greenwich Union was next door to an existing Young's pub, the Richard I, and the two pubs were combined into a larger Richard I.

Meantime also operates a visitor's centre attached to its brewing site on Blackwall Lane. In August 2014, Meantime opened the Beer Box on the Greenwich Peninsula close to the North Greenwich underground station, and in December of the same year, the business opened its Tasting Rooms and Brewery Shop within the grounds of its Greenwich brewery,

References

External links

Youtube video of Meantime Brewery on BBC Inside Out

Breweries in London
British companies established in 2000
Food and drink companies established in 2000
Asahi Breweries